Douglas Munro  (1866 in London – 27 January 1924 in Birmingham, Warwickshire) was an English actor.

Selected filmography
 Liberty Hall (1914)
 The Christian (1915)
 Arsène Lupin (1916)
 The Hypocrites (1916)
 The Game of Liberty (1916)
 Dombey and Son (1917)
 The Top Dog (1918)
 The Life Story of David Lloyd George (1918, suppressed until 1996)
 The Garden of Resurrection (1919)
 General Post (1920)
 Darby and Joan (1920)
 Duke's Son (1920)
 Testimony (1920)
 London Pride (1920)
 The Lure of Crooning Water (1920)
 A Temporary Vagabond (1920)
 The Mirage (1920)
 The Bigamist (1921)
 The Sport of Kings (1921)
 Vanity Fair (1922)
 Dicky Monteith (1922)
 A Sporting Double (1922)
 The Grass Orphan (1922)
 A Romance of Old Baghdad (1922)
 Fires of Fate (1923)
 Tons of Money (1924)
 The Desert Sheik (1924)

References

External links
 

1866 births
1924 deaths
English male film actors
English male silent film actors
Male actors from London
20th-century English male actors